John Malecki (born May 26, 1988) is a former American football offensive guard. He signed with the Tennessee Titans as an undrafted free agent in 2010. He played college football at Pittsburgh.

Since 2016, John has had a YouTube channel "John Malecki" making projects ranging from do it yourself to fine furniture, made out of wood, metal, and epoxy. He co-hosts a podcast, "Made for Profit", with Brad Rodriguez of the YouTube channel Fix This Build That.

College career
He played college football at Pittsburgh. He was named to the Big East All-Academic Football Team. After the 2008 season, he was selected as the Pittsburgh Panthers Most Improved Offensive Player.

Professional career

Tennessee Titans
On April 26, 2010, Malecki signed with the Tennessee Titans as an undrafted free agent. On August 10, 2010, he was released.

Cleveland Browns
On August 13, 2010, Malecki signed with the Cleveland Browns. On August 31, he was released.

Tampa Bay Buccaneers
On October 26, 2010, Malecki signed with the Tampa Bay Buccaneers to join the practice squad. After spending the 2010 season on the practice squad, he was re-signed by the Tampa Bay Buccaneers on January 4, 2011 to a futures contract.

Pittsburgh Steelers
On August 7, 2011, Malecki signed with the Pittsburgh Steelers. On September 2, 2011, he was released. On September 4, 2011, he was signed to the practice squad.

Washington Redskins
On October 19, 2011, Malecki was signed with the Washington Redskins to join their practice squad. On October 26, 2011, he was released from the practice squad.

Return to the Pittsburgh Steelers
On January 18, 2012, Malecki was signed by the Pittsburgh Steelers to a future contract. On August 31, 2012, he was released. On September 1, 2012, he was signed to the practice squad. On October 20, 2012, he was promoted to the active roster. On October 27, he was waived after the team promoted safety Da'Mon Cromartie-Smith to the active roster. On October 30, Malecki was re-signed to the practice squad. On November 26, 2012, he was promoted to the active roster.

References

External links
 Pittsburgh Panthers bio
 Tennessee Titans bio
 Cleveland Browns bio
 Tampa Bay Buccaneers bio
 Washington Redskins bio
 Pittsburgh Steelers bio

Pittsburgh Steelers players
Pittsburgh Panthers football players
Tennessee Titans players
Living people
1988 births
American football offensive guards
Players of American football from Pittsburgh